Nils Muižnieks (born 31 January 1964 in the United States) is a Latvian-American human rights activist and political scientist. He had served as the Council of Europe's Commissioner for Human Rights between 2012 and 2018, succeeding Thomas Hammarberg (2006–2012) and Álvaro Gil-Robles (1999–2006).

Early life
Muižnieks' parents, Ansis and Ingrid, were both refugees who left Latvia in 1944. They spent 6 years in displaced persons camps in the American zone in Germany before moving to the United States in 1950. His father is a retired medical doctor and his mother was trained as an architectural historian.

Born and educated in the United States of America, Nils Muižnieks obtained a PhD in political science at the University of California at Berkeley (1993). Prior to that, he graduated as a Bachelor of Arts in politics at Princeton University summa cum laude and obtained a Master of Arts degree in political science from the same University (1988).

He married Andra Fedder, a piano teacher and singer, in 1992. They have two daughters, Laila and Milena. Nils Muižnieks's mother tongues are Latvian and English, he is also fluent in French and Russian.

Professional life
Prior to his appointment as Commissioner for Human Rights, he held prominent posts such as Programme Director at the Soros Foundation-Latvia, Director of the Advanced Social and Political Research Institute at the Faculty of Social Sciences of the University of Latvia in Riga (2005–2012); Chairman of the European Commission against Racism and Intolerance (2010–2012); Latvian minister responsible for social integration, anti-discrimination, minority rights, and civil society development (2002–2004); and Director of the Latvian Centre for Human Rights and Ethnic Studies (now Latvian Centre for Human Rights) (1994–2002). Member of the Latvia's First Party (2003-2005), its co-chairman and one of its ministers in the Government.

As member (2005–2010) and Chair (2010–2012) of the European Commission against Racism and Intolerance (ECRI), Muižnieks represented ECRI before international political bodies, human rights mechanisms and international organizations such as the EU, OSCE, UN. He was Rapporteur for country reports on Poland, the Netherlands, Slovakia; member of working groups for Ireland, Iceland, Norway; and chair of the working group on combating racism in policing.

During his governmental appointment (2002–2004), he was responsible for social integration policy; the rights of persons belonging to national minorities; combating racial and ethnic discrimination; and civil society development. He was also responsible for legislation in anti-discrimination, social integration, the legal framework for NGOs and coordinated inter-ministerial working groups for the Latvian National Programme on Tolerance and policy framework for strengthening civil society. He advised local governments on integration policy and represented Latvia before the EU, OSCE, UN.

As Director of the Latvian Centre for Human Rights and Ethnic Studies (now Latvian Human Rights Centre), he strengthened the organisational focus on human rights education and promotion; monitoring of closed institutions; and the promotion of gender equality and rights of persons belonging to national minorities.

Muižnieks was also engaged in evaluation and training activities in the field of human rights. Among his main activities, he was the evaluator of a project on democracy building in Belarus; evaluator for the European Commission for the 7th Framework Research Programme on Citizenship and Democratic Ownership; and expert on conflict resolution and social cohesion for the Joint EU assessment mission to Georgia.

Commissioner for Human Rights 
On 24 January 2012 Muižnieks was elected Commissioner for Human Rights by the Parliamentary Assembly of the Council of Europe obtaining 120 of the votes cast in the first round, an absolute majority. He took office on 1 April 2012 and stated that he intends to develop the contribution of the Commissioner's Office to the effective observance and full enjoyment of human rights in the 47 member states of the Council of Europe. His work as Commissioner for Human Rights pivots on country and thematic work, with a particular focus on the most vulnerable groups, such as children, the elderly, persons with disabilities, and Roma. Muižnieks has received a lot of media coverage for his support of the Roma population.

Further work concerned the human rights of migrants, including, asylum-seekers and refugees; women's rights and gender equality; minority rights; and the importance of respecting human rights standards within the information society, in particular as regards media freedom, data protection, social networking and access to digital literacy. He also enhanced the co-operation with national human rights structures with the aim of fostering human rights oriented policies at national level and addressing systemic shortcomings in member states.

Candidacy for European Ombudsman
In 2019, Muižnieks was one of five candidates for the post of European Ombudsman; however, he dropped out after the first round of voting in the European Parliament.

Amnesty International 
In June 2020, Muižnieks began work as Amnesty International's Regional Director for Europe.

Publications
Muižnieks has published extensively on human rights issues, in particular on racism, discrimination, minority rights, children's rights, and women's rights. Among his long list of publications (below) the following ones are noteworthy.

The most recent one is "Max van der Stoel and Latvia" which appeared in a special edition of the journal Security and Human Rights, Vol. 22, No. 3 (November 2011), and was devoted to the memory of former OSCE High Commissioner on National Minorities Max van der Stoel, with whom Muižnieks worked closely in the 1990s.

He also edited and co-wrote The Geopolitics of History in Latvian-Russian Relations (2011 at the University of Latvia Press), in which he wrote a conceptual introductory chapter and contributed a chapter entitled "Latvian-Russian Memory Battles in the European Court of Human Rights". In these articles he examines in depth the intertwining of human rights and history issues in the Latvian jurisprudence and the impact of these controversies on Latvian-Russian relations.

Editor and co-writer of How Integrated is Latvian Society? An Audit of Achievements, Failures and Challenges (University of Latvia Press, 2010), he wrote the book's introduction and conclusion about the situation in Latvia, and contributed a chapter entitled "Social Integration: A Brief History of an Idea", in which he traces the intellectual history of the concept of social integration in the social science literature and in the work of international human rights bodies and the European Union.

To commemorate 20 years after the fall of the Berlin Wall, he contributed an article entitled Creating the "Open Society Man" (and Woman!), published in Open Society News (Fall 2009 issue).

With Ilze Brands Kehris (former chair of the management board of the EU's Fundamental Rights Agency and head of the OSCE High Commissioner on National Minorities office in the Hague) he wrote "The European Union, democratization, and minorities in Latvia", a detailed analysis of the role of EU conditionality issues related to citizenship and language in Latvia, which was published in The European Union and Democratization (ed. Paul J. Kubicek. London: Routledge, 2003).

Full list of publications

Monographs 
 2011 Latvian-Russian Relations: Dynamics Since Latvia's Accession to the EU and NATO. University of Latvia Academic Press. 
 2008 Georgian Security: A Latvian Perspective (with a contribution by Rasma Kārkliņa). Riga: University of Latvia Press.

Academic Articles and Book Chapters 
 2011 "Max van der Stoel and Latvia," Security and Human Rights, Vol. 22, No. 3 (November 2011), 257–260. 
 2011 "History, Memory and Latvian Foreign Policy," and "Latvian-Russian Memory Battles at the European Court of Human Rights." In The Geopolitics of History in Latvian-Russian Relations, ed. Nils Muižnieks. Riga: University of Latvia Press, 7-18, 207–226. 
 2010 "Introduction," "Social Integration: A Brief History of An Idea," and "Conclusion." In How Integrated is Latvian Society? An Audit of Achievements, Failures and Challenges, ed. Nils Muižnieks. Riga: University of Latvia Press, 7-32, 279–284. 
 2010 "Responsibility in Latvia’s Relations with the Diaspora." In Latvia Human Development Report 2008/2009: Accountability and Responsibility, ed. Juris Rozenvalds and Ivars Ijabs. Riga: University of Latvia Press, 130–135. 
 2009 "A Political Scientist’s Experience in the Real World of Politics," European Political Science (EPS) 8, 2009, 68–78. 
 2008 "Introduction" (with Daunis Auers); "Anti-Americanism in Latvia: An Exploratory Essay" (with Pēteris Vinķelis). In Latvia and the USA: From Captive Nation to Strategic Partner, ed. Daunis Auers. Riga: University of Latvia Press, 5–8, 119–126. 
 2008 "Latvia: managing post-imperial minorities" (with David J. Galbreath). In Minority Rights in Central and Eastern Europe, ed. Bernd Rechel. London: Routledge, 135–150. 
 2008 "Introduction"; "Latvia’s Economy – the Offshore Next Door"; "Conclusion". In Manufacturing Enemy Images? Russian Media Portrayal of Latvia, ed. Nils Muižnieks. Riga: University of Latvia Press, 5–8, 145–160, 161–3. 
 2008 "Ethnic Relations in Latvia in 2020: Three Scenarios". In Latvija 2020: Nākotnes izaicinājumi sabiedrībai un valstij [Latvia in 2020: Future Challenges for Society and the State], ed. Žaneta Ozoliņa and Inga Ulnicane-Ozolina. Riga: University of Latvia Press, 155–170. 
 2006 "Introduction"; "Government Policy Towards the Russians"; "Russia’s Policy Towards "Compatriots" in Latvia". In Latvian-Russian Relations: Domestic and International Dimensions, ed. Nils Muižnieks . Riga: University of Latvia Press, 5–8, 11–21, 119–130. 
 2006 "Lettland: Russischsprachige Minderheit – Geschichte, gegenwartiger Status und Perspektiven". In Die zehn neuen EU-Mitgliedstaaten – Spezifika und Profile, ed. Rudolf Hrbek. Berlin: Berliner Wissenschafts-Verlag.23-30. 
 2005 "Résoudre, enfin, la question des minorités... " In Itinèraires baltes, ed. Celine Bayou. Paris: Editions Regard sur l’Est, 67–71. 
 2005 "Preface", "Latvia". In Racist Extremism in Central and Eastern Europe, ed. Cas Mudde. London: Routledge, X-XII, 101–128. 
 2003 "The European Union, democratization, and minorities in Latvia" (with Ilze Brands Kehris). In The European Union and Democratization, ed. Paul J. Kubicek. London: Routledge, 30–55. 
 2002 "Private and Public Prejudice". Social Research (69, No. 1, Spring), 195–200. 
 2002 "Human Development and Human Rights", "Non-Citizens". In Tautas attīstība (Human Development), ed. Evita Lune. Riga: UNDP/Soros Foundation – Latvia, Jumava. (in Latvian), 31-38 and 216–223. 
 2000 "Minority Rights", "The Historical Development of Human Rights in Latvia 1918-2000". In Cilvektiesības Latvijā un pasaulē (Human Rights in the World and in Latvia), ed. Ineta Ziemele. Riga: Izglitibas soli. (in Latvian), 114-121 and 191–240. 
 1998 "Civic Consciousness: Criteria and Indicators." In Pilsoniskā apziņa (Civic Consciousness), ed. Elmārs Vēbers. Riga: LU FSI. (in Latvian), 36–42. 
 1997 "Latvia: Rebuilding a State, Restoring a Nation". In New States, New Politics: Building the Post-Soviet Nations, ed. Ian Bremmer and Ray Taras. Cambridge: Cambridge University Press, 376–397. 
 1996 "Topical Human Rights Issues in Latvia". In Cilvēktiesību žurnāls (Human Rights Quarterly) No. 3, 1996, Riga: LU Cilvektiesību instituts. (in Latvian) 
 1995 "Ethnic Stratification in Latvia: From the Soviet Era to the Present". In Nacionālā politika Baltijas valstīs (Ethnic Policy in the Baltic States), ed. Elmārs Vēbers and Rasma Kārkliņa. Riga: LZA FSI. (in Latvian), 114–121. 
 1995 "The Influence of the Baltic Popular Movements on the Process of Soviet Disintegration". Europe-Asia Studies 47, no. 1 (1995), 3-25. 
 1987 "The Daugavpils Hydro Station and Glasnost' in Latvia". Journal of Baltic Studies 18 (April 1987), 63–70.

Policy Papers and Political Analysis 
 Regular analyses of Latvian foreign and domestic policy for Oxford Analytica. 
 2011 "Latvia’s New Broom Coalition Wins Votes Despite Sweeping Cuts," Europe's World, Spring No. 17, 133–4. 
 2010 "Latvian-Russian Relations – A New Thaw?," Baltic Rim Economies, Issue No. 2, 28 April 2010, p. 23.
 2009 Nils Muižnieks, Ilona Kunda, Aija Lulle, Sigita Zankovska-Odiņa, Immigrant Integration in Latvia, ASPRI Working Paper No. 1, September 2009. 
 2008 "Latvia still among the flies in the EU-Russia ointment". Europe's World Autumn, No. 10, 195–6. 
 2001 "Extremist Threats to Democracy in Europe in 2000 and 2001". Background Paper commissioned by the Political Affairs Committee of the Parliamentary Assembly of the Council of Europe, November. 
 2001 "Expert Review Mission on Latvian National Human Rights Office and Ombudsman Functions in Latvia, Final Report." With John Hucker, Jānis Mažeiks, Lauri Lahtimaja. Riga: UNDP/OSCE Mission to Latvia. Published in Latvian in Latvijas vēstnesis (Government Herald), 19 June 2001. 
 2000 "The Struggle Against Racism and Xenophobia in Central and Eastern Europe: Trends, Obstacles and Prospects. Background paper for the Regional Seminar of Experts 'The Protection of Minorities and Other Vulnerable Groups and Strengthening Human Rights Capacity at National Level'," UN document HR/WSW/SEM.2/2000/BP.1, 30 June 2000. 
 1998 "Oil, Food, and Citizenship in Latvia’s Elections". ACE: Analysis of Current Events Vol. 10, No. 11/12, November/December 1998, 9-11. 
 1990 "The Pro-Soviet Movement in Latvia". Report on the USSR 34 (24 August 1990): 19–24. 
 1990 "The Committee of Latvia: An Alternative Parliament?" Report on the USSR 2, no. 29 (20 July 1990), 28–31. 
 1990 "The Evolution of Baltic Cooperation". Report on the USSR 2, no. 27 (6 July 1990), 18–20. 
 1989 "The Latvian Popular Front and Ethnic Relations". Report on the USSR 1, no. 42, (20 October 1989), 20–2.

Reviews 
 2008 Review of Taming Ethnic Hatred: Ethnic Cooperation and Transnational Networks in Eastern Europe by Patrice McMahon, in Journal of Baltic Studies December 2008, Vol. 39, Issue 4, 537–544. 
 2005 "Response to James Hughes." In Development and Transition, UNDP and London School of Economics and Political Science, No. 2, November 2005, 26–7.
 2005 "The Fate of Europe’s Minorities." Review of Leo Dribins, National and Ethnic Minorities in Europe. Diena 18 March 2005 (in Latvian). 
 2002 "Latvia’s Faux Pas." (Review of Nevienam mes Latviju nedodam!) FP: Foreign Policy, (January/February 2002), 88–9. 
 2001 "A Superficial Look at Integration. Review of An Institutional Analysis of Social Integration Policy." In politika.lv 22 July 2001. 
 2001 "The Gloomy Backrooms of Our Political Life." Review of Latvia Human Development Report 2000/2001.

Edited volumes 

 2011 The Geopolitics of History in Latvian-Russian Relations. Riga: University of Latvia Academic Press. 
 2010 How Integrated is Latvian Society? An Audit of Achievements, Failures and Challenges. Riga: University of Latvia Press (in Latvian and English). 
 2008 Manufacturing Enemy Images? Russian Media Portrayal of Latvia. Riga: University of Latvia Academic Publishers. 
 2007 The National Minorities Convention – the Prevention of Discrimination and the Preservation of Identity in Latvia. Riga, University of Latvia Academic Publishers. (in Latvian).
 2006 The Framework Convention for the Protection of National Minorities: Europe's Experience for Latvia. Riga: Council of Europe Information Bureau. (in Latvian). 
 2006 Latvian-Russian Relations: Domestic and International Dimensions. Riga: University of Latvia Academic Publishers. 
 2005 UNDP Latvia 1992-2005: Easing the Transition. Co-editor with Mara Simane. Riga: UNDP. 
 2002 Human Rights in Latvia in 2001. Riga: Latvian Centre for Human Rights and Ethnic Studies. 
 2001 Human Rights in Latvia in 2000. Riga, Latvian Centre for Human Rights and Ethnic Studies. 
 2000 Human Rights in Latvia in 1999. Riga: Latvian Centre for Human Rights and Ethnic Studies. 
 1999 Human Rights in Latvia in 1998. Riga: Latvian Centre for Human Rights and Ethnic Studies. 
 1997 Latvia. Human Development Report 1997. Riga: UNDP. (In Latvian and English) 
 1996 Latvia. Human Development Report 1996. Riga: UNDP. (In Latvian and English) 
 1995 Latvia. Human Development Report 1995. Riga: UNDP. (In Latvian and English)

References

External links
Official
 Commissioner's website Commissioner's Twitter account: @CommissionerHR

1964 births
Living people
Government ministers of Latvia
Members of the European Commission against Racism and Intolerance
Latvian political scientists
Latvia's First Party politicians
Council of Europe people
Latvian human rights activists
People from Los Angeles